Dharmapuri is one of the 38 districts in the state of Tamil-Nadu, India. It is the first district created in Tamil Nadu after the independence of India by splitting it from then-Salem district on 2 October 1965. Dharmapuri District is one of the major producers of mango in the state, fine quality granite is found in the district. It is also one of the main sericulture belts in the state. Around 30 percent of the district's area is under forest cover. Kaveri enters Tamil Nadu through this district. Dharmapuri district had the lowest literacy rate of 74.23% in Tamilnadu during the 2011 census.

Etymology
Dharmapuri was called Thagadur during the Sangam era. The name Thagadur is derived from two Tamil words, Thagadu meaning iron ore, and ur meaning place. The name Thagadur was changed to Dharmapuri after the Sangam period, possibly during the period of the Vijayanagara Empire or the period of the Kingdom of Mysore. The name Thagadur is still used by some of the people of Dharmapuri.

History
The region is believed to have been controlled by the Pallava dynasty in the 8th century. The Rashtrakutas took over in the 9th century. They were defeated by the Cholas in the 11th century, and subsequently the district came under the Chola sphere of governance.

During 18th century, present-day Dharmapuri district was part of the Kingdom of Mysore and was called Baramahal. As part of the Treaty of Seringapatam (signed on 18 March 1792) after the Third Anglo-Mysore War, Tipu Sultan agreed to give part of his territories including present-day Dharmapuri district to the British East India Company which was then merged into the Madras Presidency an administrative subdivision of British India.

The present-day district was part of the Salem District under British rule, until the founding of Dharmapuri district on 2 October 1965. The Dharmapuri district was split into Dharmapuri and Krishnagiri districts in 2004. Many historical rock sculptures are found in this district. Modhur, a village near Dharmapuri has remains that date back to the Neolithic age. A government museum in Dharmapuri town displays some of these significant sculptures.

Geography
The district is located between latitudes N 11 47’ and 12 33’ and longitudes E 77 02’ and 78 40’. It is bounded on the north by Krishnagiri District, on the east by Tiruvannamalai District and Kallakurichi district, on the south by Salem District, and on the west by Karnataka's Chamarajanagar District. The whole district is surrounded by hills and forests, and the terrain consists mostly of rolling plains.

Forests
The whole district is predominantly covered with forests. Spider Valley located near Hogenakkal is home to many wild animals. The district falls in the migratory path of elephants. Conflicts between man and elephant are most common in these parts. Many tribal communities depend on these forests. Vathalmalai, a mountain hamlet on top of Shervarayan hill chain has suitable conditions to cultivate coffee and jackfruit. Wild boars and spotted deer are commonly seen in Morappur and Harur forest region. Gaurs sometimes stroll near villages in the Bommidi region. Thoppur ghat has one of the area's scenic highways surrounded by mountains and forests.

Governance
Dharmapuri is the district headquarters. The district has been divided into two revenue divisions, namely, Dharmapuri and Harur consisting seven taluks.

Administrative divisions
Revenue divisions:

Dharmapuri and Harur.

Revenue taluks:

Dharmapuri, Harur, Karimangalam, Nallampalli, Palacode, Pappireddipatti, Pennagaram.

Town Panchayats:

Harur, Marandahalli, Bommidi, Palacode, Pennagaram, Karimangalam, Kambainallur, Papparapatti, Kadathur, Pappireddipatti.

Panchayat Unions:

Dharmapuri, Harur, Nallampalli, Palacode, Pennagaram, Karimangalam, Morappur, Pappireddipatti, Kadathur, Eriyur.

Demographics

According to 2011 census, Dharmapuri district had a population of 1,506,843 with a sex-ratio of 946 females for every 1,000 males, much above the national average of 929. A total of 167,940 were under the age of six, constituting 87,777 males and 80,163 females.  The average literacy of the district was 91.2% compared to the national average of 72.99%. The district had a total of 375,873 households. Scheduled Castes and Scheduled Tribes made up 16.29% and 4.18% of the population respectively. There were a total of 751,170 workers, comprising 191,080 cultivators, 217,062 main agricultural labourers, 11,308 in house hold industries, 233,546 other workers, 98,174 marginal workers, 10,248 marginal cultivators, 50,283 marginal agricultural labourers, 4,033 marginal workers in household industries and 33,610 other marginal workers. 17.32% of the population lived in urban areas. The population of the district is roughly equal to the nation of Gabon or the US state of Hawaii.

At the time of the 2011 census, 87.90% of the population spoke Tamil, 6.51% Telugu, 2.95% Kannada and 2.26% Urdu as their first language.

Politics 

|}

Economy

Agriculture
Dharmapuri and Krishnagiri districts account for more than 60% to 70% total mango production in Tamil Nadu. It is a major producer of Ragi and saamai crops in the state. Exotic crops like dates are also being cultivated by some farmers in the areas around Ariyakulam.

Kaveri river, Ponnaiyar river, Thoppaiyaru river, Chinnar river, Nagavathy river, Vanniyar river and Sanathkumara river are the rivers that drains the district

See also
Tribal Health Initiative
List of districts of Tamil Nadu

References

External links
 Dharmapuri District's Government website
 Dharmapuri District's Support website
 Dharmapuri- Idhu Namba Ooru Machi

 
1965 establishments in Madras State
Districts of Tamil Nadu